Labyrinthus is a genus of air-breathing land snails, terrestrial pulmonate gastropod mollusks in the family Labyrinthidae.

Distribution 
This genus occurs in South America.

Species
Species within the genus Labyrinthus include:
 Labyrinthus bifurcatus (Deshayes, 1838)
 Labyrinthus chiriquensis / Lampadion chiriquensis (Pilsbry, 1899)
 Labyrinthus cymatodes / Lampadion cymatodes (Pfeiffer, 1852)
 Labyrinthus furcillatus (Hupé, 1853)
 Labyrinthus labyrinthus “Chemnitz” Deshayes (Cheminitz, 1795)
 Labyrinthus leprieurii (Petit, 1840)
 Labyrinthus leucodon (Pfeiffer, 1847)
 Labyrinthus manueli Higgins, 1872
 Labyrinthus oreas Koch
 Labyrinthus otis (Lightfoot, 1786)
 Labyrinthus orthorinus Pilsbry, 1899
 Labyrinthus plicatus (Born, 1780) / Labyrinthus plicata (Born, 1778)
 Labyrinthus raimondii (Philippi, 1867)
 Labyrinthus tamsiana (Dunker, 1847)  
 Labyrinthus tarapotensis (Moricand, 1858)
 Labyrinthus umbrus Thompson, 1957
 Labyrinthus uncigera (Petit, 1838)
 Labyrinthus yatesi (Pfeiffer, 1855)
 Labyrinthus vexans Dohrn
 Labyrinthus yatesi (Pfeiffer, 1855)

References

External links 

 Image of Lampadion sp. from Colombia

Labyrinthidae
Gastropod genera